The Greek lamprey (Caspiomyzon hellenicus) (also known as the Greek brook lamprey) is a species of jawless fish in the Petromyzontidae family. It is endemic to Greece. Its natural habitats are rivers and freshwater springs. It is threatened by habitat loss. This species may be better included in the genus Caspiomyzon. It is the most endangered species of lamprey. It lives only in the Strymon and Louros river basins.

References

Freshwater fish of Europe
Fish described in 1982
Endemic fauna of Greece
Taxonomy articles created by Polbot
Petromyzontidae